Shakhovsky (masculine) or Shakhovskaya (feminine) is a Russian surname that may refer to
Evgeniya Shakhovskaya (1889–1920), Russian pilot
Natalia Shakhovskaya (1935–2017), Russian cellist

Russian-language surnames